PostFinance is the financial services unit of Swiss Post which was founded in 1906. As of 2023, it is the fifth largest retail financial institution in Switzerland. Its main area of activity is in the national and international payments and a smaller but growing part in the areas of savings, pensions and real estate.

PostFinance is fully-owned by the Swiss government.

History
In 2013, the Swiss Financial Market Supervisory Authority (FINMA) awarded PostFinance a bank licence. In 2015, PostFinance was declared a "Systemically important financial institution" in Switzerland by the Swiss National Bank, which means the bank must follow special regulations with regards to liquidity and equity. In 2016, PostFinance started to levy a 1% annual fee on deposits of above 1 million francs.

In 2020, PostFinance's profits fell to 131 million Swiss francs (from 246 million in 2019 and 229 million francs in 2018) and its customers to 2.69 million (from 2.74 million in 2019). 129 jobs were cut to adjust to the revenue drop (500 jobs were also cut in 2018).

In early 2021, the Swiss government was considering the privatization of the bank to allow it to act like a regular private financial institution (including granting mortgages and loans). This process would however imply changing the Postal Act and have the government back the bank's capital during a transition phase. In February 2022, the Russian oligarch and resident of Switzerland Viktor Vekselberg won a lawsuit against PostFinance after the bank had closed his account in 2018 following sanctions imposed on him by the US authorities.

Description
PostFinance has an AA+ credit rating from Standard & Poor's.

References

External links

  

Banks of Switzerland
Banks established in 1906
Swiss companies established in 1906